Shamalan can refer to:

M. Night Shyamalan
Nawa-I-Barakzayi District in Afghanistan